The Shuping Scholarship (also known as Soh Bing Scholarship) scheme is one of the oldest Privately Funded Scholarship scheme in China. It was founded in 1939 in war tom Shanghai, China, by J. L. Koo to give continuous financial assistance to underprivileged secondary school students of good academic standard, who otherwise could not continue with their education.

Koo was at the time, aged 30, a Chinese Manager in the "EWO Hong", better known as Jardine, Matheson & Company. The idea came to him when, as a manager, he was recruiting young apprentice workers for the EWO Press and Packing Company. Well over 100 secondary students, in their early teens, applied for four vacancies of this lowly paid, menial job. Many of them had excellent school reports, but had to give up education to seek work to support their family.

He founded the scholarship scheme and named it the "Shuping Scholarship For Secondary School Students", in memory of his father Koo Shuping, who died of Acute Kidney Disease at the young age of 42. In his dying moment, Shuping instructed that his only son should work hard and honest to earn his living, and to remember that "what is gained from the society should be returned to the society". These words would become the motto of the Scholarship for all of the students to adhere to.

Scholarships are awarded, after examination, to successful candidates, coming from poor families, to cover their full tuition fee, continuously until graduation. Further support was also given to those who went on to University Studies.

A Library and Activity Centre, run by the students, was established for the scholars to study and indulge in extracurricular activities and interests. Free medical consultation and treatment were also provided. Students were encouraged to volunteer for charitable social works.

From 1939 to 1949, 1100 were benefited by this scheme. Many of them have gone on to become leaders in China, and Overseas, covering a wide spectrum of careers and professions.

In 1986, after the Cultural Revolution, with the approval and support of the Government, the Shuping Scholarship scheme was restarted in secondary schools in Shanghai, then in Beijing and Huzhou, the native place of Koo. Koo died, aged 89, in February 1998, by then the scholarship scheme had extended to 33 secondary schools and 24 tertiary institutions. The total number of awardees had expanded from 1100 in the 1940s to well over 5000 in the late 1990s. It is administrated by two main students associations, one in Shanghai and one in Beijing. Many of the new generation of Scholars have won national and international awards and prizes.

The quality of the Scholars received recognition by the Jardine Foundation and since 1996 two Shuping Scholars have been awarded Jardine Foundation Scholarships for undergraduate study at the prestigious Oxbridge Colleges; and a further two, through the Jardine connection, entered Oxford from the support other funds, one of which was the C C Lee foundation. All of them graduated with exemplary distinction.

The Shuping Scholarship Foundation (Hong Kong) was formed by Koo in 1995 as a Charity Trust Deed for the continued support of the Scholarship works in China. The founding Trustees were Koo, Philip Wong and Dr. George Koo. The same varied Trust Deed was rectified by the Hong Kong Government in 1997. The Shuping Scholarship Foundation Executive Committee was formed in 1996 to manage, coordinate, and allocate the funding of the many activities of the scheme. The committee consist of elected members of the Koo family and representatives from the two associations.

The Shuping Scholarship Works consist of:
 The award of scholarships to selected students of excellence in designated secondary schools and tertiary institutions
 The scholarship is continuous, if academic standard is maintained
 Additional financial awards to students of proven hardship
 Strong emphasis is placed on moral and ethical standard, adhering to Shuping's Motto of “what is gained from the society, should be returned to the society"
 Social and Educational meetings for the scholars
 Annual summer camps
 Yearly course of emergency medical aid
 Regular Newsletters to all Scholars and Friends of Shuping.

History

1. Founding of the Scholarship in Shanghai:

In the late 1930s, amidst the tragic, War Torn years of Japanese Invasion, as Manager of the EWO Press and Packing Factory, Koo tried to recruit 5 apprentice workers. He was flooded with 200 application, many of these were from teen age secondary students with excellent school records, who, because of financial reasons, had to give up school for work to support the family. He was very moved, and recalling the motto his father left him, that of "Return to the Society what you have gained from the society", he resolutely founded the "Shuping Scholarships" in 1939, in remembrance of his father. The applicants must be from poor families and with good academic standing. 600 students sat for the first scholarship entrance examination, and 300 were awarded with full tuition fee, and thereafter renewed yearly until graduation if the scholar can maintain their good record at school. Further support was also given to those who went on the University Studies.

In addition, a library was established for the scholars as a study-cum-activity centre, which apart from providing books for reading also included science laboratories. Free lessons in Shorthand/Typing; in Sowing; in Nursing; in Martial arts were made available. In addition Scholars were given free haircut, free medical care and free glasses. The "Library" was run and administered by the Scholars themselves on a voluntary basis. They ran a cost-cutting stationary cooperative, and also published a regular newsletter for internal communication and dialogue. Free vacation trips were arranged for volunteer workers during the school holidays to relieve their stress from study and hard work.

2. The First ten years 1939 - 1949

During the first ten years, 1100 students were awarded the scholarships. Koo treated them as family members. His house was always open to the scholars for informal gatherings and fellowship. The students were encouraged to do meaningful voluntary work for charity as character building. Thus, apart from their duties at the Library, many of them also took active part in the running of other charity projects that Koo established during this period. The first is the new Home for Refugee Children, which was built by fund raised through Peking Opera Performances arranged and produced by Koo with the generous help from his many Famous Opera Stars of the time. This was soon after the war, and the streets of Shanghai were flooded with homeless refugee children who, without proper care would fall prey to crime and violence in the city. The then existing refugee camps were shoddy, dilapidated shelters, that does not provided any rehabilitation or education to these children. The brand New home not only upgraded their accommodation but also provided moral and vocational education to turn them into future useful citizens. It was a social success. The Shuping Scholars made regular visits to the Home and assisted in the activities of the Home. The second was the Emergency Medical Fund. In 1945, after the war was won, inflation was astronomical. Although there were 80 hospitals in Shanghai, they all required payments before admission, especially in emergency cases. This made it very difficult especially for the poor with no ready cash. For those with emergency, lives were often lost through lack of money and delay in getting it. Koo persuaded a group of his close like minded friends to join him in setting up a substantial fund to combat this problem. Any emergency patient requiring hospitalization, who had immediate financial difficulty would call on the fund, which, after appropriate but prompt screening, will front the expense to allow the patient to receive prompt treatment. Afterwards, those who could pay but could not get the cash ready in time, would return to thank the benefactors and repay the money paid on their behalf. This work required a lot of administrative help, visiting the patients in the hospitals, check their progress, visit the patient's family, manage the accounts, compile monthly report to the directors, and taking charge of payments. For this Koo turned to the Scholars. To his great delight and comfort, he was overwhelmed with volunteers. As all of the Scholars were from poor families, they were particularly understanding towards the patients in need and their plight. Over a span of two years over 700 patients were recipients of this medical aid program. By exposing the scholars to voluntary charitable works, they, through these experiences, became part of the society. All of the 1100 scholars would later on become pillars in the building and modernization of China.

3. Resumption of the Scholarships (1986 - )

In 1982, Koo was invited to visit China after the overthrow of the Gang of Four. He was able to meet up with some of the past Scholars both in Shanghai and Beijing. Over the next year or so, over 200 past students were contacted, and over the many follow up trips he was thrilled to meet most of them. Joyful reunions lightened every one's heart. He was proud to learn that many of the early scholars, have made great contribution to the rebuilding of China, holding important positions in the Government, as Party Secretaries, Naval officers, Departmental heads, School Principals, Director of hospitals, Architects, engineers, professors. All were pillars of the Society and living out the Spirit of Shu Ping Motto “Return to the Society what you have gained from it"

In 1986 with the support of the Central and City Government as well as the Past Scholars, he decided to revive the Shu Ping Scholarships, starting first in Shanghai schools, followed by schools in Beijing and then Huzhou, Koo's native city. By 2000, the accumulated number of Shu ping Scholars reached near 6000 in all and increasing by the year.

Apart from the scholarship award, recipients, as was in the days of inception in the 1940s, are encouraged to foster the ideal of service to fellow scholars, to friends and to the community. 2.4 Present Scope and Activities

As at May 2004, the scholarship scheme gives out over 700 awards yearly to 37 secondary schools and 24 tertiary institutions. Besides the selection, approval and giving out the awards additional monetary awards are open to application for students with financial difficulty or family hardship. The latter is the integral part of the founding principle of this scholarship, that of helping the poor and the disadvantaged.

Monetary award is only part of the aim, many extracurricular activities (see 7 "activities of the scholars"), are arranged every year to further moral and physical education to motivate students to be better citizens and future leaders in the community and in the country.

All these programs and activities are planned, administered, coordinated, and executed by the two main Scholarship Alumni Associations, composed of voluntary board members elected by the Scholars: The Shanghai Alumni Association for South China Area and the Beijing Alumni Association for the North.
Regular newsletters are published by the two Association to inform scholars of events and to be used as a platform for air.

4. The Shu Ping (Soh Bing) Scholarship Foundation

In 1995, at the age of 86, Koo donated HK$10 million to the Shanghai Education Development Foundation headed by Vice Mayor Ms Xhia Li Xheun, on trust. The annual incremental income is earmarked for the continuation of the Scholarships. In the same year the Shu Ping Foundation Executive Committee was formed by Koo and representative members of the two Alumni Association, he being its first chairman. The committee was to discuss and decide on all matter pertaining to the audit of accounts; allocation, supervision and direction of foundation funds for the operation and furtherance of the scholarships.

After his death, his son George was elected as chairman. The committee meets at least once a year, and subcommittee meetings are held whenever needed. The day-to-day administration and activities of the scheme are carried out by the relevant association boards. The early Shu Ping tradition of self-reliance—students administered by the students—has continued to this day.

Biography
Business man, industrialist and philanthropist. Standing member of the 7th & 8th Shanghai Political Consultative Committee; Consultant in education to the Beijing City; Hon. Consultant to the International Human Resource Exchange Bureau of the Liaoning Province; Hon. Citizen of Huzhou, Zhekiang Province; Adviser to the Board of Jardine Matheson & Company; Chairman of Koo & Company; Chairman of the Executive Committee of the Shuping Scholarship Foundation.

 Koo, of Huzhou ancestry, was born in January 1909 in Shanghai, the only son of Koo Soh Bing.
 He received his early education at the Shanghai Huzhou School, the Wah Dung School, and FuDan Experimental School.
 His father died of acute kidney failure when he was only aged 17. Thus he had to give up study and stepped into his father's shoe to work as an apprentice manager at the EWO Press and Packing Company, a joint venture of his family with the British firm of Jardine & Matheson. At the time, the Packing Company was ailing and heavily in debt.
 He married Liu Size Ming, also from Huzhou, in 1929
 With hard work, smart business acumen and honest repute, he was able to turn the Packing Company to profitability. His ability was recognised and from 1937 he was appointed the sole agent for cotton purchase for the EWO textile business. With the hard earned success in business, he was motivate for humanitarian philanthropy
 In 1939, seeing that many academically excellent students hacl to give up schooling, because of poverty, he established the Shuping Scholarship Scheme in Memory of his father whose last words to his son was that if and when you are successful, you should "return to the society what you have gained from the it". These words also became the motto for all the Scholars. Open examinations were held for applicants.
 The Scholarships were also unique because it was continuous, whereby if the students kept up with his or her standard, they will be supported until graduation and beyond.
 A designated activity centre was established as a Library, Science Laboratory and for other extracurricular activities of the scholars. Free medical consultation and treatment were provided for.
 Between 1939 and 1949 around 1100 students had received the scholarship. Even during the World War II, the through the Japanese occupation, the scholarship was maintained, sometimes with self sacrifices from himself and Mrs. Koo. He cared for the personal lives of each scholar and treated them like his own sons and daughters.
 The Emergency Medical Aid Society: In 1946, with the help from his business associates, he founded this society to give emergency financial aid to help those who require treatment for acute illness. It gave immense assistance to over 7000 patients during the two years of operation.
 In 1947, with his Peking Opera Friends, he organised charity performance to raise fund for the building of a Home cum Institute for the many destitute refugee street children in Shanghai. He followed this up with setting up of qualified teaching staff in the institute to give these children proper education and vocational training.
 His association with Jardine also grew closer both at business and personal level. During the Japanese occupation, many of the Jardine expatriate personnel were interned in camps. With the assistance of the Swiss consulate, he arranged regular monthly food parcels to be delivered to the camps to alleviate their hardship.
 After the end of WWII, he was promoted to be the Chinese Manager at Jardines and also manager of the Shanghai Hung Kew Wharf
 He and his family moved to Hong Kong in 1949, where he continued his association with Jardine's in their Cotton department. He also began his interest in other areas of business, The Star Textiles, Far East Textiles, and later the Textile Alliance Company. After his retirement from textiles, he founded the stock brokerage firm of Koo & Co., and became an adviser to the Board of Jardine's until his decease in 1998.
 During his sojourn in Hong Kong, he continued with his zest for charitable works and was board director of the Tung Wah Group of Hospitals for 5 years. He again raised fund for the group including organising and performing in Peking Opera performances. Mrs. Koo was also involved in the Po Leung Kuk, a charitable institute for orphans and related works.
 In 1982, with the passing of the tumultuous Cultural Revolution, he was able to return to mainland China, and to liaise with his beloved Shuping Scholars. Thereafter he made such visits at least once a year and to pay homage and respect to his ancestral graves in Huzhou.
 In 1986, with the support of the Government and of the past scholars, he restarted the Shuping Scholarships first in schools in Shanghai, followed by schools in Beijing and Huzhou. It now awards scholarships in 37 secondary schools and 24 tertiary institutions.
 In December 1986, the directors of Jardine, Matheson & Company in Hong Kong and him held a joint celebration for the Anniversary for his 60th years' Association with Jardines. A lifetime of trust and friendship.
 1987 - he was appointed member of the Political Consultative Committee of the City of Shanghai
 In 1988, for his lifetime of humanitarian and charitable endeavors, he was recognized and honoured with the honorary degree of Doctor of human letters by the College of St. Rose of New York, U.S.A.
 1989. He was honored by his native city of Huzhou as their favorite son and the city's first Honorary Citizen. The City of Beijing appointed him as Adviser to the Bureau of Education. Koo visited the Liaoning Province, and met the Provincial Governor Lin Shun and discussed educational exchange matters. He was invited to be a consultant to the Liaoning overseas educational exchange association, and arranged Lecture tours in Mainland by one of his past Scholars, the eminent Prof. Xhi Zhen Kwong Chi from the U.S.A.
 Back in 1980, Koo had a major operation on his prostate, he made a good recovery, but by 1990 he became more easily tired and had to give up his regular morning walk and Breathing Exercise. He grew weaker physically and from 1992 he often needed the wheelchair for ambulation.
 In the Spring of 1994, during his regular trip to Beijing Koo and his wife were received and welcomed by Vice Premier and Foreign Minister, Qian Qichen who himself was a Shuping Scholar in the 1940s. Later in the same year, Mrs. Koo was suddenly struck down with cerebral haemorrhage and required emergency operation on the brain. It had complication and needed a second operation to save life. However, after this she never recovered fully her cognitive powers and was paralysed from hemiplegia. She was thereafter a wheelchair user when not confined to her bed.
 In 1989, at the age of 80, he wrote his autobiography listing out what he regarded the ten miracles in his life that he was blessed by in his life, allowing him to attain achievements he never dreamt of.

His life motto was:

"Filial Piety to your Parents
Treat People with Honesty
Credibility as Foundation in Business
Tolerance in dealing with the Affairs of the World"

In concluding the Memoir he was philosophical and positive about life:

Youth will not return

A day has only one morn

Make hay while there's still sun

As time will wait for no one

25. In 1995, Koo donated HK$10 million to the Shanghai Education Development Foundation, to be earmarked for use towards the continuing support of the Shuping Scholarship scheme

26. From 1996, his health progressively deteriorated, but despite this he continued to make regular visits both to Shanghai, Beijing and Huzhou, including paying homage to his graveyard of his parents in Huzhou. Filial Piety has been the foremost virtue in his mind.

27. During 1996 to 1998, he also made repeated donations to his native city of Huzhou for various new school buildings, named after his father Shuping.

28. On 14 February 1998, he died aged 89

29. It was also his dying wish that his ashes will be eventually buried in Huzhou next to his parents'.

Foundation
Up to 1995, since the founding of the scholarships in 1939, Koo personally financed all the awards and costs. In his twilight year with ailing health, in 1995, he donated 10 million HK dollars to the Shanghai Education Development Foundation to be earmarked for the long term funding of the worthwhile scheme.

In addition, he also donated a property in Shanghai, partly used as office for the Scholarship administration and functions and the rest for rental income to fund the relevant expenses for the running of the scholarships.

In late 1995, he also formed a charitable trust, the "Shuping Scholarship Foundation" in Hong Kong, for supplemental support to the Shu Ping Scholarships in China. Donations to the Foundation will be used exclusively for the advancement and development of the Shu Ping Scholarship works and activities in China.

The executive committee of the Shu Ping Foundation, formed in 1995, consisting of The representative officers of the two associations and family members, is the central governing body for the prudent allocation of the fund to the various areas of the Scholarship Activities.

Major Events
 1939 Founding of the scholarship in Shanghai
 1943 Established the Shuping Library, administration and activity centre. Formation of Student Association. Free medical consultation and treatment. Haircut service, Cooperative discount outlet, Emergency loans to students.
 1944 Publication of monthly Newsletters
 Science laboratories for students
 Free Nursing class, Seamstress class, Typing class, Chinese King Fu class
 1945 Formation of football team, Ping Pong team,
 1946 Exhibition of the Shuping Scholars attended by the Mayor of Shanghai
 1947 Established the Emergency Medical Financial Aid Society for Shanghai citizens
 Most of the administrative work for this charitable organisation were done by the Scholars on a voluntary basis
 1948 Founded the Centre for Refugee Children in Shanghai, with Scholars again volunteering help in the administration.
 1982 Koo visited Shanghai and met with group of past scholars, and later visited Beijing to meet past scholars there
 1986 Shuping Scholarships scheme resumed in Shanghai in 7 schools, then followed by schools in Beijing and Huzhou. By 1998 scholarships were awarded in 33 secondary schools, and 24 tertiary institutions.
 1986 The Approval and Establishment of the Shuping Scholars Association' in Shanghai and then Beijing, with past scholars as officers and committee members, directing the administration and various activities.
 1989 50th Anniversary of the Scholarships, publication of commemoration book and staged a grand exhibition in the no. 3 Girls school in Shanghai
 1990 Granted the establishment of a hall in the Little Lotus Garden of Nanzun for the permanent exhibition of the Shuping Scholarship scheme and the achievements of past and present scholars.
 1995 Donation of HK$10,000,000 by Koo to the Shanghai Education Development Foundation for support towards the continuation of the Shuping Scholarships
 1995 Established the Shuping Scholar.ship Foundation in Hong Kong for the furtherance of the Scholarships. The Trust deed was finalised in 1998
 1996 Established the executive committee of the Shuping Foundation in China for the overall supervision and policy of the Scholarship planning and funding. Koo being the founding chairman, George Koo vice chairman, and representative members from the Shanghai and Beijing Associations
 1998 Koo died on 14 February 1998, and George Koo succeeded him as chairman of the executive committee
 1999 The 60th anniversary of the Scholarships with celebration meetings in Beijing, Shanghai and Huzhou., Publication of special commemoration book and collection of essays. Production of a documentary VCD. Addition of 3 schools of performing arts for Scholarship awards, two in Beijing and one in Shanghai.
 2001 Official Institution of giving supplemental financial awards to hardship students
 2003 Addition of the Hung Chi Class of the Kwong Jul Mun School for scholarship awards
 2004 Renovation of the Exhibition Halls in Nanzun

References

External links
 The Shuping Scholarship Website
 The Shuping Scholarship Website(Shanghai)
 The Shuping Scholarship Website(Beijing)

Scholarships in China